The 2017 Internationaux de Tennis de Blois was a professional tennis tournament played on clay courts. It was the fifth edition of the tournament which was part of the 2017 ATP Challenger Tour. It took place in Blois, France between 19 and 25 June 2017.

Singles main-draw entrants

Seeds

 1 Rankings are as of 12 June 2017.

Other entrants
The following players received wildcards into the singles main draw:
  Benjamin Bonzi
  Jonathan Eysseric
  Gianni Mina
  Alexandre Müller

The following player received entry into the singles main draw as a special exempt:
  Félix Auger-Aliassime

The following players received entry from the qualifying draw:
  Maverick Banes
  Tallon Griekspoor
  Corentin Moutet
  Jürgen Zopp

The following player received entry as a lucky loser:
  Grégoire Jacq

Champions

Singles

  Damir Džumhur def.  Calvin Hemery 6–1, 6–3.

Doubles

  Sander Gillé /  Joran Vliegen def.  Máximo González /  Fabrício Neis 3–6, 6–3, [10–7].

References

External links
Official Website

2017 ATP Challenger Tour
Internationaux de Tennis de Blois
2017